Conover is a surname of both Dutch and Irish origin. Notable people with the surname include:
Adam Conover (born 1982), American stand-up comedian
Charlotte Reeve Conover (1855–1940), American author, lecturer, political activist and educator
Daniel Conover (1822–1896), American public servant political activist and industrialist
David Conover (1919–1983), American author and photojournalist credited with discovering Marilyn Monroe
David G. Conover, American documentary film and television director
David O. Conover (born 1953), American marine biologist
Henry Boardman Conover (1892–1950), American ornithologist
Larry Conover (1894–1945), early National Football League player
Lloyd Conover (1923–2017), American inventor of tetracycline
Mark Conover (1960–2022), American long-distance runner and coach. 
Richard Field Conover (1858–1930), American tennis player, lawyer and real estate manager
Scott Conover (born 1968), former National Football League player
Simon B. Conover (1840–1908), Senator from Florida
Ted Conover (born 1958), American writer
Teresa Maxwell-Conover (1884–1968), American Broadway actress
William Sheldrick Conover II (born 1928), Congressman
Willis Conover (1920–1996), American jazz producer and broadcaster on the Voice of America

References